The Man from Lost River is a lost American silent drama film directed by Frank Lloyd and released in 1921. It stars House Peters, Fritzi Brunette, and Allan Forrest.

Plot
As described in a film magazine, Jim Barnes (Peters) has been raised in the woods and knows little of how to associate with women. As foreman at a lumber camp, he comes to love Marcia Judd (Brunette), but his backwardness allows her to be won over by the smooth talking Arthur Fosdick (Forrest), a New York society man who had recently come to the camp. Realizing that the young woman is in love with the Easterner and the weakness of his character, Jim constitutes himself as Marcia's protector without her knowledge. After proving his utter worthlessness, Arthur's death is brought about by his own cowardice, Marcia awakens to the strength of a noble man's love.

Cast
House Peters as Jim Barnes	 
Fritzi Brunette as Marcia Judd
Allan Forrest as Arthur Fosdick	 
James Gordon as Rossiter	 
Monte Collins as Mr. Carson 
Milla Davenport as Mrs. Carson

References

External links

 franklloydfilms.com

1921 films
American silent feature films
Films directed by Frank Lloyd
1921 drama films
Silent American drama films
American black-and-white films
Lost American films
Films based on works by Katharine Newlin Burt
1921 lost films
Lost drama films
1920s American films
1920s English-language films
English-language drama films